Soldier On is an EP by American musician Andrew Bird.

Track listing

Other appearances
 "The Water Jet Cilice" appears as a bonus track on Armchair Apocrypha with the name "Self-Torture"
 A version of "Heretics" also appears on Armchair Apocrypha
 "How You Gonna Keep 'Em Down on the Farm" is a cover of the World War I-era song, How Ya Gonna Keep 'em Down on the Farm (After They've Seen Paree)?. The lyrics are the same, but the melody, chords, and tone have been changed.
 "Oh Sister" is a Bob Dylan cover, originally from the album Desire
 A live version of "Sic of Elephants" was recorded for 30 Days, 50 Songs

References 

Andrew Bird albums
2007 EPs